The DF8 (Chinese: 东风8; translation: East Wind, Easterly) is a type of diesel locomotive used in China. It was in production from 1984 until mid-1990s, with mass production starting in 1989. The revised DF8B is still in production today. DF8 are almost exclusively used for freight services.

Models

DF8
The first generation DF8 is powered by the original  16V280ZJ engine, manufactured by Qishuyan Locomotive and Rolling Stock Works. 141 locomotives are produced from 1989-1997. The prototype engine DF8-0001&0002 features different hull design with the batch-produced engines.

41 engines (0001-0041, including 2 prototype engines) assigned to South Wuchang Locomotive Depot, China Railway Wuhan Group, 100 engines assigned to Mudanjiang Locomotive Depot, China Railway Harbin Group.

DF8B
Qishuyan manufactured 0 series, while Ziyang Locomotive Works manufactured 5000 series.

7000 series version 
In 2000, Qishuyan built a DF8B with radial bogies numbered DF8B-7001. As an experimental locomotive there was only one produced. Now it is owned by Liuzhou Locomotive Depot, Nanning Railway Bureau.

9000 series version 
Qishuyan built a few DF8Bs originally for Qingzang Railway, however they were unsuccessful. They were numbered DF8B-9001 and 9002.

Other versions and related models 

A variant of DF8B has been designed for use in Jamaica by Qishuyan.

12 CKD4Cs were exported to Venezuela and are called DF8Bven, however they are generally identical to the domestically used DF8B.

A variant of DF8B has been designed for Mombasa-Nairobi railway in Kenya.

A variant of DF8B, DF8BI, has been designed for use in Iran. There is another model SDD21 designed for Iran, equipped with a 12V280ZJ engine.

A variant of DF8B, CKD9A, has been designed for use in Turkmenistan.

A variant of DF8B, SDD16, has been designed for use in Guinea.

There is a model SDD17 with 12V280ZJ prime mover, used in Saudi Arabia.

There is a model SDD19 with 6280ZJ prime mover, used in Uzbekistan.

Passenger models DF9 and DF11 series use the same 16V280ZJA prime mover as DF8B.

DF8BJ 
The DF8BJ, which uses the 16V280ZJG engine, GTO VVVF inverter and AC traction motors, was produced by Ziyang. It was designed for Qingzang Railway.

DF8CJ 
The DF8CJ is produced by Qishuyan. It was equipped with a 16V280ZJB (R16V280ZJ) engine (maximum power ) and AC traction motors.

Later passenger model HXN5K, freight model HXN5B and FXN5C use a 12-cylinder version (R12V280ZJ) prime mover.

DF8DJ 
Ziyang made a special DF8B which was originally intended to be used on the Qingzang line and was numbered DF8DJ-0001. The Chinese Ministry of Railways rejected the proposal and it was renumbered DF8B-5672. It's now running on Xiyan Line in Shaanxi and has been remodified with dual-fuel engine (LNG & diesel oil).

Preservation
 DF8-0001: preserved at China Railway Museum
 DF8-0092: preserved at Shenyang Railway Museum
 DF8-0089: on display at Mudanjiang Locomotive Depot

See also 
 Iranian locomotives
 EMD DDA40X
 List of locomotives in China
China Railways DF11
China Railways DF11G

References

External links 

 
 
 

DF8
Co-Co locomotives
Railway locomotives introduced in 1984
Standard gauge locomotives of China